A facility information model is an information model of an individual facility that is integrated with data and documents about the facility. The facility can be any large facility that is designed, fabricated, constructed and installed, operated, maintained and modified; for example, a complete infrastructural network, a process plant, a building, a highway, a ship or an airplane.
The difference with a product model is that a product model is typically a model about a kind of product expressed as a data structure, whereas a facility information model typically is an integration of 1000–10,000 components and their properties and relations and 10,000–50,000 documents. A facility information model is intended for users that search for data and documents about the components of the facility and their operation.

A Facility Information Model can be an instantiation of a fixed data model or it can be expressed in a flexible modeling language such as Gellish English.

A facility information model about a plant, a building, etc. is usually called a Plant Information Model, a Building Information Model, etc.

A Facility Information Model can be created according to various modeling methods. For example, the Gellish Modeling Method  enables to model it in a system-independent and computer-interpretable way. This means that the model can be imported and managed in any system that is able to read Gellish English expressions. A facility information model is in principle system independent and only deals with data and document content.

Architecture 
A Facility Information Model consists of at least the following sections:
1. A Facility Model, which may include processes and activities
2. A Documents and Data sets section
3. An electronic Common Dictionary
And possibly also:
4. Requirements Models

The Facility Model
A Facility Model describes a facility, primarily in a breakdown structure that specifies a decomposition hierarchy of the facility. For example, the facility may be decomposed in sections, whereas each section is decomposed in units and utility systems, which are further decomposed in equipment systems, control loops, sub-systems, which are decomposed in pieces of equipment, building components, etc. as far as required.
The Facility Model consists partly of the facts (data) that are expressed as relations between the components and their properties and relations to other 'objects'. That data reflects the facility and its operation and its properties.

Documents and data sets section
Another section of the Facility Information Model consists of documents and data sets in various formats. Each of those documents and data sets is related to the element in the facility model about which the document or data set contains information.

Electronic Common Dictionary
Each facility model component, property, activity as well as each document and data set shall be defined. This is normally done by classification. The classes (concepts) that classify the objects are defined in an electronic Common Dictionary. To ensure consistency and communication between systems and other parties that dictionary is also an integral part of every Facility Information Model.
 
Requirements Models
The quality of a Facility Information Model is determined by its completeness, consistency, up-to-dateness and accessibility. To measure that quality it is necessary to define requirements. This is preferably done in a computer interpretable way. These requirements and standard specifications have the nature of relations between kinds of things.

Implementation 

A facility information model can be implemented in various ways. The essence is that the user of a system by which the data and documents are accessed should experience it as one integrated system. Nevertheless, the system may be constructed such that the documents are stored in a simple directory or such that they are stored in a separate document management system and the data are stored in one or more databases.
Important kinds of systems in which Facility Information Models will most likely be implemented are document-oriented systems, such as Electronic Document Management Systems (EDMSs), Content Management Systems (CMS systems) or Enterprise Content Management Systems (ECM systems). Another kind of systems in which facility information models may be implemented are more data-oriented systems, such as Product Data Management Systems (PDM systems) and Product lifecycle management systems (PLM systems). Examples of some of the Facility information models include QuickBase, Inc., MYBOS, ServiceChannel, AwareManager, OfficeSpace Software, eSSETS, faciliCAD, VAR facility management solutions and SKYSITE.

See also 
 Facility management

References 

Data modeling